Stephen William Brennan (March 20, 1893 – April 9, 1968) was a United States district judge of the United States District Court for the Northern District of New York from 1942 to 1968 and Chief Judge from 1948 to 1963.

Education and career

Born in Clinton, New York, Brennan received a Bachelor of Laws from Albany Law School in 1915. He was a Captain in the United States Army until 1916. He was a law clerk in private practice in New York from 1915 to 1916. He was in private practice in New York. He was an attorney for the New York State Tax Department.

Federal judicial service

On March 31, 1942, President Franklin D. Roosevelt nominated Brennan to a seat on the United States District Court for the Northern District of New York vacated by Judge Frank Cooper. Brennan was confirmed by the United States Senate on April 28, 1942, and received his commission on May 6, 1942. He served as Chief Judge from 1948 to 1963. He assumed senior status on May 1, 1963, and continued serving in that capacity until his death on April 9, 1968, in Utica, New York.

References

Sources
 

1893 births
1968 deaths
Judges of the United States District Court for the Northern District of New York
United States district court judges appointed by Franklin D. Roosevelt
20th-century American judges
Albany Law School alumni
United States Army officers